This article contains information about the literary events and publications of 1626.

Events
February – The King's Men premiere Ben Jonson's satire on the new newsgathering enterprise The Staple of News, his first new play in almost a decade, at the Blackfriars Theatre in London.
November – The deaths of Lancelot Andrewes and Nicholas Felton, Bishop of Ely, prompt John Milton, then a student at Cambridge, to write elegies in Latin for both.
December 27 – Izaak Walton marries Rachel Floud (died 1640).

New books

Prose
Francis Bacon – The New Atlantis
Nicholas Breton – Fantastickes
Alonso de Castillo Solórzano – Jornadas alegres
Robert Fludd – Philosophia Sacra
Marie de Gournay – Les Femmes et Grief des Dames (The Ladies' Grievance)
Francisco de Quevedo – El Buscón (first published edition – unauthorized)

Drama
Pieter Corneliszoon Hooft – Baeto, oft oorsprong der Holanderen
John Fletcher and collaborators – The Fair Maid of the Inn
William Heminges – The Jews' Tragedy
Jean Mairet – La Sylvie
Philip Massinger – A New Way to Pay Old Debts
Thomas May – Cleopatra
Thomas Middleton – The Triumphs of Health and Prosperity
Tirso de Molina – La Huerta de San Juan
James Shirley – The Maid's Revenge; The Brothers

Births
January – Robert Howard, English dramatist and politician (died 1698)
February 5 – Madame de Sévigné, French letter writer (died 1696)
March 12 – John Aubrey, English antiquary and writer (died 1697)
June 3 – Philippe Goibaud-Dubois, French writer and translator (died 1703)
Unknown dates 
Elizabeth Egerton, Countess of Bridgewater, English poet and dramatist (died 1663)
Alonso de Olmedo y Ormeño, Spanish actor and dramatist (died 1682)

Deaths
February – William Rowley, English dramatist (born c. 1585)
February 28 – Cyril Tourneur, English dramatist (born 1575)
September 25
Lancelot Andrewes, English scholar and bishop (born 1555)
Théophile de Viau, French poet and dramatist (born 1590)
October 19 (estimated) – Béroalde de Verville, French poet and novelist (born 1556)
December 8 – Sir John Davies, English poet (born 1569)
unknown date – Samuel Purchas, English miscellanist and travel writer (born c. 1577)
probable – Nicholas Breton, English poet and novelist (born c. 1545)

References

 
Years of the 17th century in literature